Samac is a 1958 animated short directed by Vatroslav Mimica for Zagreb Film. The short won the studio's first international prize at Venice Film Festival. The short is described as a "mordant, yet moving depiction of a clerk fighting a losing battle with the machine age".

References

External links

1958 animated films
1958 films
Croatian animated short films
Yugoslav animated short films
Zagreb Film films